Kelvin Grove State College is a government primary secondary school in Kelvin Grove, City of Brisbane, Queensland, Australia, three kilometres from Brisbane’s central business district and adjacent the Kelvin Grove campus of Queensland University of Technology (QUT). Some of the school's buildings are listed on the Queensland Heritage Register.

History 
It was formed in 2002 with the amalgamation of Kelvin Grove State High School and Kelvin Grove State School and is one of the largest government educational institutions in Australia. The school is recognised for its emphasis on the performing arts, achievements in all facets of school life and its cultural diversity reflecting the experience of inner city Brisbane communities.

The amalgamation was an initiative of the Government of Queensland's Smart State initiative. The name was voted upon by students, staff and administration in 2001 from a selection of choices. Thus, the school became a P-12 (prep to year twelve) school for state enrolments. The amalgamation also created 3 sub schools; 'The Junior School' catering for grades prep to 5, 'The Middle School' catering for grades 6 to 9 and 'The Senior School' catering for grades 10 to 12.

In 2006 the school joined the Healthy State system and removed a large proportion of junk food, including all soft drinks.

In 2016, Kelvin Grove State College became an independent public school.

In 2017, Kelvin Grove announced Michele Bridges as their Nutrition Ambassador for the Sporting Excellence programs.

Motto

The school's motto is 'The Pursuit of Excellence With All Thy Might'. The old motto, which appears in the school anthem, 'Scientia ad Sidera' (Latin for 'knowledge to the stars'), was the Kelvin Grove State High School motto before amalgamation. The motto of Kelvin Grove State School, 'With All Thy Might' remains an underlying principle of the school, and awards under the name of this motto are awarded for high levels of drive and passion, regardless of academic performance. On most certificates, awards and emblems, the motto, 'With All Thy Might' is used.

Schools of excellence 

As of 2021, the College has a number of schools of excellence, which students can choose to extend their learning choices in a particular field. They are: (Year Levels available to)
 Engineering Technology School of Excellence (11-12)
 Queensland Aviation School of Excellence (10-12)
 Queensland Dance School of Excellence (7-9)
 Queensland Golf School of Excellence (4-12)
 Queensland Football School of Excellence (6-12)
 Queensland Tennis School of Excellence (5-12)
 Queensland Volleyball School of Excellence (6-12)
 Art and Design School of Excellence (11-12)
 Music School of Excellence (3-12)
 Queensland Senior Ballet Program (10-12)

Some limitations do apply to entry and an audition process is usually required to gain entry. All these schools of excellence are an extra cost to the free education provided by a state school. Limited scholarships are available to some applicants.

Isaka Cernak & Adam Sarota who play for Brisbane Roar as well as Robbie Kruse who plays for Melbourne Victory and Scott Higgins who is signed for Gold Coast United in the A-league are former students with KGSC's Soccer Excellence.

David Williams (footballer) is another former student of the Soccer Excellence. Williams now plays for The Wellington Phoenix has two caps for the Socceroos (Australian National Team).

Arts
The Performing Arts Department offers courses in drama, dance and music with links to QUT’s "Creative Industries" program. Students can also expand their performing arts studies with the following specialised programs:

Queensland Senior Ballet Program (QBSP) in partnership with Queensland Ballet (Years 10-12) QBSP is a comprehensive, part-time program which consists of four hours of dance training in the mornings and three hours of academic classes each weekday afternoon, with a further five hours of dance training on Saturdays.

Kelvin Grove also has the largest Visual Art department in Queensland, with a dedicated art faculty and computer design laboratories.

Kelvin Grove music student Sarah Bakker has performed in numerous roles including the understudy in Phantom Of The Opera, the cast toured around Australia in 2008 and 2009.

Many QDSE dancers, vocalists, choir members and a select group of musicians have taken part in celebrations and concerts such as the Q150 Creative Generations concert at the Brisbane Entertainment Centre.

Kelvin Grove has an excellent Instrumental Music Program. In 2013, the Symphonic Wind Ensemble, Percussion Ensemble and Corelli Strings toured to Sydney. The Percussion Ensemble perform regularly at school events and competitions throughout Brisbane.

Sporting houses 

There are four sporting houses at KGSC which were also the sporting houses of KGSHS:
 Herbert
 Lutwyche
 Petrie
 Bowen

The houses were originally based on the first letter surname, however, to even out the numbers in each house this has become less obvious. In previous years, members of Schools of Excellence were all placed in the same sporting house, however this was unfair on other houses and the policy was scrapped. The names of the houses are all derived from important persons in the development of Queensland. Many suburbs near the school are also named after these people, and so many students have come to believe that the houses are named after the suburbs.

The primary school used to have its own separate houses before amalgamation. They were Long (yellow), Bancroft (red) and Walker (Blue). Long and Walker were both long serving principals from the early years of KGSS, while Bancroft was a local person of importance.

Notable alumni 

 Kate Jones – Minister for Education of Queensland
 Robbie Kruse – soccer player, plays for VfL Bochum in the German 2. Bundesliga
 Piers Lane – pianist
 Kate Miller-Heidke – independent singer, songwriter and actress
 Adam Sarota – soccer player, played for Brisbane Strikers, Brisbane Roar, Utrecht, and Go Ahead Eagles
 Andrew Stockdale – lead singer of the band Wolfmother
 David Williams – soccer player, currently plays for Haladás in the Nemzeti Bajnokság I
 Quan Yeomans – lead singer of the band Regurgitator

References

External links
Kelvin Grove State College

Public high schools in Brisbane
Schools of the performing arts in Australia
Educational institutions established in 2002
2002 establishments in Australia